Christiane Friederike Wilhelmine Herzlieb, known as Minna (22 May 1789 – 10 July 1865) was the foster-daughter of the German publisher, Carl Friedrich Ernst Frommann (1765–1839).

Life
Her father was a superintendent in her birthplace of Züllichau, Lower Silesia.  Orphaned in infancy, she was brought up in the house of the publisher Carl Friedrich Ernst Frommann in Jena. In 1807 she came to Weimar, where she met Goethe, who presented her with some sonnets. She also served as an inspiration for the character of "Ottilie" in his Elective Affinities.

In 1821 she married professor  but it was not a love match and may have contributed to her mental breakdown and death in a mental hospital in Görlitz in 1865.

External links 
 
 Biographical notes @ Internet Archive
 Goethezeit Portal
 Goethe biography @ Odyssee Theatre

1789 births
1865 deaths
People from Sulechów
German publishers (people)
People from the Margraviate of Brandenburg
Johann Wolfgang von Goethe